Mr. Right & Mr. Wrong: One Down & Two To Go is a compilation album by Nomeansno. After the departure of long-time guitarist Andy Kerr, the group's lineup stood simply as a two-piece (brothers Rob and John Wright) at the time of the album's recording.

The tracks on the album are culled from three sources – five songs (tracks 4, 6, 12, 15 and 16) from home demos dating from 1979-1980, four outtakes (3, 5, 7 and 9) from the 1993 Why Do They Call Me Mr. Happy? album, and several new songs (1, 2, 8, 10, 11, 13 and 14) from a 1994 session.  Of this latter group, two (8, 14) are performed by Mr. Wrong, Rob Wright's solo project, one (13) attributed to the Nomeansno side-project The Hanson Brothers, (12,15) are performed by John Wright/Andy Kerr project, Infamous Scientist, one is a cover of a Nomeansno song (10) by the Vancouver, British Columbia-based band Swell Prod.

Track listing
 "Intro" – 2:23
 "Red on Red" – 3:37
 "Who Fucked Who?" – 6:26
 "Pigs and Dogs" – 5:25
 "Widget" – 3:40
 "More ICBMs" – 3:09
 "Blinding Light" – 2:45
 "I'm Doing Well" – 4:04
 "This Wound Will Never Heal" – 6:23
 "Real Love" – 3:40
 "Remember" – 3:30
 "Baldwang Must Die" – 2:01
 "Victoria" – 2:31
 "Sitting on Top of the World" – 5:05
 "Canada is Pissed" – 3:11
 "Burn" – 5:37

Personnel
 John Wright (Mr. Right) – Vocals, Drums, Keyboards
 Rob Wright (Mr. Wrong) – Vocals, Bass, Guitar
 Tom Holliston – Guitar (track 13)
 Ken Kempster – Drums (track 10)
 Ken Jensen – Drums (track 13)
 Swell Prod. – track 10
 The Hanson Brothers – track 13

1994 albums
Nomeansno albums